Steinbach Regional Secondary School is a large public high school located in Steinbach, Manitoba, the second largest high school in the province with over 1700
students. The school was built in 1972 and was opened by then premier, Ed Schreyer on January 25, 1973. A second expansion of 100,000 square feet to the school was completed in 2014 and grade nine was added to the school. The school offers extensive academic, arts, music and vocational programming. Steinbach Regional is part of Hanover School Division, which is the second largest school division in Manitoba after the Winnipeg School Division. The sports teams are known as the Sabres.

Notable alumni

Scott Bairstow, actor
Ted Falk, politician
Kelvin Goertzen, 23rd Premier of Manitoba
Megan Imrie, Olympian, biathlon
Chris Neufeld, Brier-winning curler
Vic Peters, Brier-winning curler
The Pets, rock band
Byron Rempel, author
Royal Canoe, rock band
Michelle Sawatzky-Koop, Olympian, volleyball
Miriam Toews, award-winning novelist
The Undecided, punk band
The Waking Eyes, rock band
Ian White, NHL hockey player

References

High schools in Manitoba
Educational institutions established in 1973
1973 establishments in Manitoba
Education in Steinbach, Manitoba